Mahabir Singh Rana is an Indian politician and member of the 05th, 06th, 08th, 09th and 10th Legislative assemblies of Uttar Pradesh. Rana represented the Deoband constituency of Uttar Pradesh and is a member of the Indian National Congress political party.

Political career
Mahabir Singh Rana has been a MLA for five terms (from 1969 to 1991). During all his terms, he represented the Deoband constituency. In 1977, he lost the election to Mohammad Usman. Rana has been a member of the Indian National Congress political party.

Posts held

See also

Deoband
Uttar Pradesh Legislative Assembly
Government of India
Politics of India
Indian National Congress

References

Year of birth missing
Possibly living people
Indian National Congress politicians
People from Saharanpur district
Uttar Pradesh MLAs 1974–1977
Uttar Pradesh MLAs 1989–1991
Uttar Pradesh MLAs 1985–1989
Uttar Pradesh MLAs 1969–1974
Uttar Pradesh MLAs 1980–1985